Fluhr may refer to:

Places

People with the surname
Jeff Fluhr, American business executive